The Anhui Wenyi Oriental Dragons Basketball Club, commonly known as simply the Anhui Oriental Dragons, are a Chinese professional basketball club based in Hefei, Anhui. The team plays in the National Basketball League. Founded in 2013, Wenyi won its first NBL championship in 2016.

The owner of the team is Anhui Wenyi Investment Holding Group.

Honours
 National Basketball League
 Winners (1): 2016
 Runners-up (2): 2015, 2017

Players

Current imports

Notable players

 Darnell Jackson (2015)
 Manny Harris (2016)
 Chris Singleton (2016)
 Jonathan Gibson (2017)
 Bernard James (2017)
 Chris Johnson (2017)
 DeQuan Jones (2018–present)
 Jameel Warney (2018–present)
 Dakari Johnson (2019)

References

Basketball teams in China
Sport in Anhui
Basketball teams established in 2013
2013 establishments in China